Netrokona Medical College is a government medical college in Netrokona, Bangladesh, founded in 2018 and affiliated with Dhaka University. The class of the first batch of 50 students was commenced on January 10, 2019 on its temporary campus of Netrokona Sadar Hospital.

References

Medical colleges in Bangladesh
Netrokona District